Czesław Nawrot (11 March 1942 – 20 May 2019) was a Polish rower. He competed in the men's coxless pair event at the 1964 Summer Olympics.

References

1942 births
2019 deaths
Polish male rowers
Olympic rowers of Poland
Rowers at the 1964 Summer Olympics
People from Krotoszyn County